The 1999 CPSL League Cup was the 2nd edition of the Canadian Professional Soccer League's league cup tournament running from July through late September. Toronto Olympians successfully defended their league cup title after defeating Toronto Croatia 3-0 at Centennial Park Stadium in Toronto, Ontario, which resulted in the establishment of their league cup dynasty. The format used in the competition was the traditional group stage with the two top clubs advancing to the semi-finals.

Group stage

Group A

Group B

Semi-finals

Toronto won 6–2 on aggregate.

Toronto won 2–0 on aggregate.

Final

References 

CPSL League Cup
CPSL League Cup
CPSL League Cup